Two Friends is an American DJ/producer duo made up of Eli Sones and Matthew Halper. The Los Angeles-based duo gained popularity for their remixes, original discography, and hour-long "Big Bootie" mixes. They have most notably remixed classics such as Blink 182's "I Miss You" and The Killers' "Mr. Brightside", with official remixes for Lana Del Rey, Tove Lo, The Chainsmokers, Tori Kelly, Vicetone and Echosmith as well.

Early life
Sones grew up in Los Angeles, while Halper moved around before settling into LA at the age of ten.They met each other in seventh grade while attending Brentwood School throughout their middle and high school years. At the very end of high school, the duo formed Two Friends, coming up with the name together during a Senior Seminar class they had both enrolled in. They began working on hip-hop beats in the software Pro Tools, producing for several up-and-coming rappers before pivoting towards the electronic realm. After visiting the Sahara Tent at Coachella and being slowly introduced to electronic music by some friends and family, they became even more fascinated with the emerging genre and soon dove in head-first.

Growing up, Halper had a strong background in music, starting guitar lessons at the age of eight, training in music theory, and singing in his high school choir. Traditionally his listening interests were dominated by alternative rock and rock classics such as Blink-182, Led Zeppelin, and Bon Jovi.  Matt's brother Daniel produced music under the name Lieutenant Dan. Ultimately, Matt decided to follow in his footsteps.

Sones' focus was more centralized around DJing and mashups. During high school, Sones went by the moniker "The Friendly Giant" before linking up with Halper and forming Two Friends. His early musical interests were predominantly hip-hop and indie rock.

Soon after starting to create music together, Sones moved to Nashville, Tennessee to attend Vanderbilt University and Halper to Palo Alto to attend Stanford University. Halper majored in Product Design and Sones in Human & Organizational Development, but much of their time was dedicated to the Two Friends project. For the most part, the first four years of Two Friends was long-distance; however since graduating and returning home to LA in 2015, Halper and Sones have been working the Two Friends project full-time.

Musical style
Two Friends recently described their music as "songs that are fun and get you dancing and moving, but also hopefully resonate with you on a more emotional level at the same time... [They are] kind of a melting pot of a lot of different elements and influences- whether from dance music, from pop, even from alternative rock or hip-hop."

Music career
One of their first big opportunities came in 2014, when their remix of Lana Del Rey's "Born to Die" was added to regular rotation on SiriusXM's EDM Station BPM. Later in 2014, they released two singles with the band Breach the Summit (now known as Armors) titled "Our Names in Lights" and "Long Way Home".

Their next originals came in 2016 with "Forever" and "Overdose" on Armada Music, both amassing millions of plays throughout Spotify, Soundcloud and other streaming services. In 2016 the musical group toured more vigorously than ever before, playing frequently across North America.

Their second and most popular EP "Out of Love" was released in early 2017 through Spinnin' Records, featuring what would become two of their most popular songs, "Out Of Love" and "Pacific Coast Highway". They subsequently embarked on the “Out Of Love Tour” in the beginning of 2017. The remainder of 2017 saw the releases “Emily”, “While We’re Dreaming” and “Just A Kid”, with the accompanying tours including shows at major venues and festivals such as Electric Forest Festival, Terminal 5, and more.  The "Just a Kid Tour" is scheduled for early 2018 with an extensive, US-dominated calendar of dates.

The duo has amassed over twenty-seven #1 tracks on Hype Machine, as well as garnered praise from The Chainsmokers, who named them "Most Underrated Artist" in a 2017 Reddit Thread. They have recently undertaken official remixes for artists such as Steve Aoki, Louis Tomlinson, Audien, 3LAU, Vicetone and many more.

They are signed with LA-based management company SALXCO and represented by Creative Artists Agency.

Radio show
In 2012, Two Friends debuted their mix series Friendly Sessions, which feature thirty minutes of their favorite songs across the dance realm alongside a thirty-minute guest mix from producers and DJs. Friendly Sessions has featured acts such as Lost Kings, Louis the Child, Mako and more.

Awards
In November 2015, Two Friends received the “Award of Independent Excellence” from Hollywood Music in Media Awards.

In December 2017, they received “Top DJ Set” honors from Soundcloud in the 2017 Soundcloud playback for “Big Bootie Mix Volume 11”.

Discography

Extended plays

Singles

Remixes
2012
John de Sohn featuring Andreas Moe – "Long Time" (Two Friends Remix) 
I Am Lightyear – "Lose Myself" (Two Friends Remix)
Chase & Status featuring Delilah – "Time" (Two Friends Remix)

2013
James Egbert – "Back to New" (Two Friends Remix)
Mutrix featuring Charity Vance – "Come Alive" (Two Friends Remix)
Slap The Bag and Mapp featuring Katie Pearlman - Take The Sky (Two Friends Remix)
Blondfire – "Where The Kids Are" (Two Friends Remix)
Quintino and Alvaro – "World in Our Hands" (Two Friends Remix)

2014
Lana Del Rey – "Born to Die" (Two Friends Remix)
RAC featuring Matthew Koma – "Cheap Sunglasses" (Two Friends Remix)
Urban Cone – "Sadness Disease" (Two Friends Remix)

2015
Vicetone – "Angels" (Two Friends Remix)
Echosmith – "Cool Kids" (Gazzo and Two Friends Remix)
Tori Kelly – "Expensive" (Two Friends Remix)
Alesso featuring Roy English – "Cool" (Two Friends Remix)
Milky Chance – "Flashed Junk Mind" (Two Friends Remix)
Blink 182 – "I Miss You" (Two Friends Remix)
The Chainsmokers featuring ROZES – "Roses" (Two Friends Remix)
Dropout – "Slowly" (Two Friends Remix)
Fetty Wap featuring Adriana Gomez – "Trap Queen" (Two Friends and Instrum 'Trap King Cover')

2016
Vicetone featuring Cosmos and Creature – "Bright Side" (Two Friends Remix)
The Chainsmokers featuring Halsey – "Closer" (Two Friends x Class and Clowns Remix)
Tove Lo – "Cool Girl" (Two Friends Remix)
Shaun Frank and KSHMR featuring Delaney Jane – "Heaven" (Two Friends Remix)
Blink-182 – "I Miss You" (Two Friends and Schoolz VIP Remix)
Pegboard Nerds featuring Johnny Graves – "Just Like That" (Two Friends Remix)
MAX – "Lights Down Low" (Two Friends Remix)
The Killers – "Mr. Brightside" (Two Friends Remix)
Galantis – "No Money" (Two Friends Remix)
Audien featuring Lady Antebellum – "Something Better" (Two Friends Remix)
Mako – "Way Back Home" (Two Friends Remix)

2017
The Chainsmokers – "Break Up Every Night" (Two Friends Remix)
Audien and 3LAU – "Hot Water" (Two Friends Remix)
KYLE featuring Lil Yachty – "iSpy" (Two Friends Remix)
Steve Aoki and Louis Tomlinson – "Just Hold On" (Two Friends Remix)
MGMT – "Kids" (Two Friends Remix)
Passion Pit – "Sleepyhead" (Two Friends Remix)

2018
Charlie Puth – "How Long" (Two Friends Remix)
Dua Lipa – "IDGAF" (Two Friends Remix)
Kanye West – "Touch The Sky" (Two Friends Remix)
Red Hot Chili Peppers – "Otherside" (Two Friends Remix)

2019
Panic! at the Disco – "High Hopes" (Two Friends Remix)
Blink-182 – "All the Small Things" (Two Friends Remix)

2021
Fitz – "Head Up High" (Two Friends Remix)

References

External links
 Official website

American musical duos
Record production duos
American DJs
Record producers from New York (state)
American electronic music groups
Sirius XM Radio programs